Bardot were a trio of singer/songwriters whose sound was sometimes compared to Crosby, Stills & Nash and The Eagles. The band released 'Rockin In Rhythm' in 1978 on the RCA label, a collection of polished folk rock songs heavy on melody and complex harmonies. Three singles were also released, the debut Witchfire hitting number 14 in the Dutch charts.

Ray McRiner on guitar and vocals, was also known for his compositions, arrangement, vocal and instrumental work with Sweet, and as touring guitarist for the band. 

Laurie Andrew on guitar and vocals, was also a successful solo recording artist in his own right with the single I'll Never Love Anyone Anymore, a top of the Pops appearance, along with composition and vocal credits for work with Sir Cliff Richard, Boney M, Traks, Gianco, Keith Forsey (session musician for Harold Faltermeyer and Giorgio Moroder among others), and Lesley Duncan.

Personnel 
 Ray McRiner - composer, guitar, vocals
 Laurie Andrew - composer, vocals 
 Chris Bradford - composer, vocals
 Pip Williams - producer

Discography

Albums 
 1978 - Rockin in Rhythm 
 1978 - No Bad Habits (Graham Bonnet) - backing vocals

Singles 
 1977 - 7" Witchfire / Hero's Reward
 1978 - 7" Julie / Mountain Side (Netherlands)
 1978 - 7" No-One Cries / All The Ladies

References

External links
 https://www.youtube.com/playlist?list=PL482C509D1E42B8C3
 http://www.marsbardot.com/
 http://www.last.fm/music/Bardot+(UK)

English rock music groups
British rhythm and blues musical groups
Musical groups established in 1977